Scientific Knowledge and Its Social Problems is a 1971 book by Jerome Ravetz. It contains a reasoned illustration of science as a social process with all the failing and imperfections of human endeavors.

Content
'It is impossible to understand the social and ethical problems confronting
science without recognizing the falsity of the assumption, crucial to traditional
theories of science, that the results of scientific research must be
essentially good and true. Dr. Ravetz demonstrates the role of choice and
value-judgment, and the inevitability of error, in scientific research'.

Important aspects of the book are the social construction of facts, science as a craft with essential tacit elements, the role of choice and value judgment, and the inevitability of error. The book argues that the internal quality control system of industrialized science will suffer severe problems: "The problem of quality control in science is thus at the centre of the social problems of the industrialized science of the present period." Moore (1973) summarizes the main claims of Ravetz's work are as follows: "First, historically the social character of science has undergone tremendous changes. Secondly, the traditional philosophies of science which conceive of science as an activity in the pursuit of truth are obsolete. And thirdly, it is imperative to develop a new philosophy of science which accounts for the social nature of contemporary science."  Ravetz analyzes the transition from basic science to 'industrialized science', with particular attention of issues of degeneration (shoddy science). He also focuses on entrepreneurial science, where a scientist becomes more concerned with research grants and power than
with the quality of his scientific research.  The need for 'good morale', i.e. for an ethos of science upheld by a community of peers is mentioned in relation to the danger that such an ethos may not survive 'industrialized science'. For Gowing (1974) the main difficulty of this work is the confusion among the different kinds of science addressed by the inquiry: 'natural sciences, pure and applied', versus 'any sort of disciplined inquiry', up to include 'social sciences'.

Reviews
For Higgins "Ravetz best sections deal with science as a craft ... but a craft nonetheless. This science-as-craft cannot be taught independent of its ideology. One learns a craft at a master's knee, as one learns style. What this really means is that students must learn to make judgments about their actions; also about their behaviors, their science, their data." For Rothman (1974) Ravetz elucidates "the processes by which genuine and meaningful scientific knowledge accumulates. These chapters – nine
in all – from the most interesting and useful part of the book. His description of the emergence and refinement of scientific facts is articulated by the argument that science is craftman's work."

References

External links 
Excerpts
Related material
Book's page at Google books

1971 non-fiction books
Books about science
Books by Jerome Ravetz
Epistemology literature